Events in the year 2021 in Serbia.

Incumbents
President: Aleksandar Vučić
Prime Minister: Ana Brnabić
President of the National Assembly: Ivica Dačić

Events
Ongoing — COVID-19 pandemic in Serbia
Ongoing - Protests against proposed Rio Tinto mining operations

July 23 – August 8 - 87 athletes from Serbia will compete at the 2020 Summer Olympics in Tokyo, Japan.

27 November - Hundreds of environmental protesters blocked several major roads in Serbia on Saturday to protest against two new laws that they say will give free rein to foreign mining companies in the country. Serbia's government has offered mineral resources to companies including China's Zijin copper miner and Rio Tinto, but green activists say the projects would pollute land and water in the Balkan nation. Chanting slogans against the government and conservative President Aleksandar Vucic, demonstrators brought traffic to a standstill in the centre of Belgrade and blocked a stretch of a main highway through the Serbian capital. In the northern city of Novi Sad, dozens of protesters briefly scuffled with police and protest organisers said several activists had been detained.

Deaths
January 7 – Biserka Cvejić, opera singer (b. 1923).
February 19 – Đorđe Balašević, singer-songwriter (b. 1953).

March 6 – Boris Komnenić, actor (b. 1957).

April 6 - Predrag Živković Tozovac, singer

References

 
2020s in Serbia
Years of the 21st century in Serbia
Serbia
Serbia